BlueHat (or Blue Hat or Blue-Hat) is a term used to refer to outside computer security consulting firms that are employed to bug test a system prior to its launch, looking for exploits so they can be closed. In particular, Microsoft uses the term to refer to the computer security professionals they invited to find the vulnerability of their products such as Windows.

Blue Hat Microsoft Hacker Conference
The Blue Hat Microsoft Hacker Conference is an  invitation-only conference created by Window Snyder that is intended to open communication between Microsoft engineers and hackers. The event has led to both mutual understanding as well as the occasional confrontation. Microsoft developers were visibly uncomfortable when Metasploit was demonstrated.

See also 
Hacker culture
Hacker ethic
Black hat hacker

References

External links 
 Microsoft's BlueHat Security Briefings
 BlueHat Security Briefings Blog
 BlueHat Security 
 Homeland Security Consultants
 FedRAMP

Microsoft culture
Computer security
Hacking (computer security)